Andreas Pietschmann (born 22 March 1969) is a German stage, film, and television actor.

Life and career

Pietschmann played football in the youth department of Würzburger Kickers and was considered a talented player. Later, he did his military service with the Bundeswehr, during which time he also became involved in theater acting. He appeared in a stage production of Die Feuerzangenbowle, among others. After a serious car accident, Pietschmann decided to pursue acting seriously.

He attended drama school in the city of Bochum from 1993 to 1996, followed by a four-year engagement at the Schauspielhaus Bochum drama theater. Following this, Pietschmann transferred to the Thalia Theater in Hamburg for the 2000/2001 season, and he left in 2007 to focus on film and television. He has also participated in numerous radio productions.
Additionally, Pietschmann has narrated several audiobooks, including The Shadow of the Wind by Carlos Ruiz Zafón, The Law of Dreams by Peter Behrens, Thanks for the Memories by Cecelia Ahern, and The Brief Wondrous Life of Oscar Wao by Junot Díaz.

Pietschmann gained fame due to his role in GSG 9 – Ihr Einsatz ist ihr Leben. On the show, he plays the urbane Konstantin "Konny" Brendorp, who comes from a noble family. From 2017 to 2020, he had a starring role in the Netflix series Dark.

Since then, he has worked both at the Maxim Gorki Theater in Berlin, as well as having several guest roles in various television series.

Pietschmann lives in Berlin with his partner, the actress Jasmin Tabatabai, and has two children with her: a daughter, Helena Leila (born 5 July 2009), and a son, Johan Anton (born 13 August 2013). Pietschmann is also the stepfather to Tabatabai's daughter Angelina, from her previous marriage.

Selected filmography

Film

Television

Audiobooks
 2010: Alicia Bessette: Weiß der Himmel von Dir (together with Jessica Schwarz), publisher: der Hörverlag, 
 2014: Frauke Scheunemann: Hochzeitsküsse, publisher: der Hörverlag, 
 2017: Gil Ribeiro: Lost in Fuseta, publisher: Argon Hörbuch, 
 2020: Gil Ribeiro: Schwarzer August: Lost in Fuseta. Ein Portugal-Krimi, publisher: Argon Verlag, 
 2020: Michael Ende: Jim Knopf und Lukas der Lokomotivführer - Kinderoper, publisher: Hörbuch Hamburg,

References

External links

 Official website
 
 Andreas Pietschmann at the German Dubbing Card Index

1969 births
Living people
Actors from Würzburg
German male film actors
German male television actors
21st-century German male actors
20th-century German male actors